Shawnae or Shaunae is a feminine given name. It is a variant of Shauna/Shawna, derived from Shawn or Sean, an Irish Gaelic name. Its origin is English and means "God is Gracious". The name may refer to:

Shawnae Dixon (born 1976), American chef and cookbook author
Shawnae Jebbia (born 1971), American entertainer and former beauty queen
Shaunae Miller-Uibo (born 1994), Bahamian sprinter

Feminine given names